Bimini Run is a third-person shooter video game for the Sega Genesis. It was developed by Microsmiths and published by Nuvision Entertainment in 1990. Bimini Run allows two player to traverse a wide scrolling environment on objective based missions.

Plot
The story begins with the kidnapping of a Kim Ohara, the sister of an expert motorboat driver and secret agent Kenji. The kidnapping is immediately traced to Dr. Orca, who has hired other boat drivers and helicopter pilots to protect his island laboratory/fortress where he plans on unleashing a super weapon on the entire world. Kenji and his partner Luka arm themselves on a power boat and prepare to rescue Kim and save the world.

Gameplay
The player controls the boat's steering by Kenji and shooting a rapid-fire bazooka by Luka. The gameplay consists of moving around the map (typically, an archipelago), completing objectives and shooting enemies who stand in the way. The player instantly loses a life if hit, so maneuvering to dodge enemy fire and other obstacles is a critical skill to learn. Typical objectives include reaching and destroying certain structures on the islands or following something around the map to their destination. New objectives are received in the form of radio messages notified of by a specific sound effect.

In the pause menu, the player can see the last radio message and the map of the area with current targets marked on it.

Reception

Bimini Run received average reception from video game critics.

References

External links
Bimini Run at GameFAQs

1990 video games
Action video games
Multiplayer and single-player video games
Naval video games
North America-exclusive video games
Sega Genesis games
Sega Genesis-only games
Video games developed in the United States
Video games set in the Caribbean